Diepenbeek is a municipality located in the Belgian province of Limburg near Hasselt. On January 1, 2012, Diepenbeek had a total population of 18,337. Its total area is 41.19 km² (15.9 sq mi) which gives a population density of 430 inhabitants per km² (1,203/sq mi).

The municipality includes the communities and hamlets of Bijenberg, het Crijt, Dorpheide, Keizel, Lutselus, Pampert, Piannesberg, Reitje, Rooierheide, Rozendaal, and Zwartveld.

It is home to Hasselt University, slowly expanding towards Hasselt itself. The Limburg Science Park is located on the university campus.

References

External links
 
Official website - Only available in Dutch

Municipalities of Limburg (Belgium)